The following is a list of lakorns, or Thai television soap operas.

1980s
Prissana (1987) - Chatchai Plengpanich and Lalita Panyopas

1990s 
Khu Kam (1990) - Bird McIntyre and Komolchanok Komolthiti
Wanida (1991) - Sarunyoo Wongkrachang and Lalita Panyopas
Nai Fun (1992) - Chatchai Plengpanich, Warut, Sinjai, and Lalita Panyopas
Pai Lod Gor (1992) - Ann Thongprasom and Bpop Ponrath
One Nee Tee Raw Koy (1993) - Bird Thongchai McIntyre and Siriam Pakdeedumrongrit
Tawipob (1994) - Sarunyoo Wongkrachang and Siriam Pakdeedumrongrit
Yam Mur Lom Pat Huan (1994) - Jetrin Wattanasin and Lalita Panyopas
Took Ka Ta Lung Labum (1994) - Joe Wattanasin and Lalita Panyopas
Dao pra sook Morning Star (1994) - Sornram Teppitak and Suvanant Kongying
Prasard Mued (1994) - Willy McIntosh and Lalita Panyopas
Prik Key Noo Kub Moo Ham - Saharat Sangkapreecha and Lalita Panyopas
Krasue (1994–1995) - Ratchaneekorn Panmanee and Satawat Dunyawichit
Fai Tang See (1995) - Willy McIntosh and Lalita Panyopas
Sai Lohit Bloodline(1995) - Sornram Teppitak and Suvanant Kongying
Sai See Pleng (1996) - Willy McIntosh and Lalita Panyopas
Torfun Kub Marvin(1996) Krekpon Mussayawanich and Phiyada Akkraseranee
Pob Pee Fa (1997) - Woranut Wongsawan and Usamanee Waitayanon
Tam Hua Jai Pai Sood Lah (1997) - Willy McIntosh and Lalita Panyopas
Fai Luong (1998) - Willy McIntosh and Tao Sarocha
Sapan Dao (1999) - Art Supawatt Purdy and Sririta Jensen
Jaosao Prisana (1999) - Ann Thongprasom and Nok Chatchai
Petch Ta Maeow (1999) - Worarat Suwannarat and Art Supawatt Purdy
Peang Kae Jai Rao Rak Gun (Miniseries) (1999)

2000s 
Hong Neu Mangkorn (2000) - Marsha Wattanapanich and Saksit Tangthong
Peang Kae Jai Rao Rak Gun (2000) - Art Supawatt Purdy and Nusaba Wanichangkul
Rarknakara (2000) - Pachrapa Chaichua and Woranuch Wongsawan
Kurak Kurob (2000) - Art Supawatt Purdy and Claudia Chakrapan
Mae Nak (2000) - Pachrapa Chaichua and Pete Thongjeur
Hua Jai Song Park (2000) - Art Supawatt Purdy and Sara Malakul Lane
Snow Ban Chow, Kudkao Ban Yen (2000) - Siriam Pakdeedumrongrit and Art Supawatt Purdy
Jao Kum Nai Waen (2001) - Lalita Panyopas and Pip Ravit
Pet Thut Pet (2001) - Pachrapa Chaichua and Jetrin Wattanasin
Fai Kamatep (2001) - Art Supawatt Purdy and Kullasatree Siripongpreeda
Keb Pandin (2001) Phutanate Hongmanop and Phiyada Akkraseranee
Ruk Kerd Nai Tarad Sod (2001) Andrew Gregson and Phiyada Akkraseranee
Sapai jow (2002) - Saharat Sangkapreecha and Sunisa Jett
Seur See Fuune (2002) - Ann Thongprasom and Chai Chatayodom
Roy lae sanae rai (2002) - Jesdaporn Pholdee and Phiyada Akkraseranee
Khon Rerng Muang (2002) - Mai Charoenpura and Art Supawatt Purdy
Khon Rerng Muang (2002)
Kammtape Tua Noy (2003) - Pachrapa Chaichua and Shakrit Yamnam
Muang Dala (2003) - Phutanate Hongmanop and Phiyada Akkraseranee
Leurd kuttiya (2003) - Jesdaporn Pholdee and Phiyada Akkraseranee
Nang Fah Rai Peak Angel with no wings (2004) - Ann Thongprasom and Andy Wantsharat
Nang Sao Jingjai Gup Nai Sandee (2004) - Pachrapa Chaichua and Jesdaporn Pholdee
Mae ai sa eun (2005) - Veeraparb Suparbpaiboon and Woranut Wongsawan
Pleung Payu (2000) - Pachrapa Chaichua and Tana Suttikhamol
Saung sanaeha (2005) - Veeraparb Suparbpaiboon and Pachrapa Chaichua
Gularb see dum (2005) - Chakrit Yamnam and Lalita Panyopas
Song Rao Nirund Dom(2005) Teeradeth Wongpuapun and Phiyada Akkraseranee
Duang Jai Patiharn Miracle of the Heart (2005)- Sornram Teppitak and Suvanant Kongying
Hua Jai Chocolate (2005) Patiparn Pataweekarn and Phiyada Akkraseranee
Oum Ruk Chain of Love (2006) - Teeradeth Wongpuapun and Ann Thongprasom
Pinmook (2006) - Pachrapa Chaichua and Cee Seewat
Kaew Tah Pee (2006) - Tik Jesdaporn Pholdee and Cherry Khemupsorn Sirisukha
Sai Leud Hang Ruk (2006) - Paul Pattrapon and Pachrapa Chaichua
Lady Maha-chon (2006) - Paula Taylor and Erich Fleshman
Naruk (2006)
Tae Jai Ruk Nak Wang Pan (2006)
Bua prim num (2007) - Tiksadee Sahawong and Rujira Chuaykuer
Theptida kon nok (2007) - Janie Tienphosuwan Pornchita Na Songkla Tai Natapon
Rangrit Pisawad (2007) - Pachrapa Chaichua and Stephan Santi
Ruk Tur Took Wan(2007) Teeradeth Wongpuapun and Phiyada Akkraseranee
Likit Gammatheap (2007) - Ann Thongprasom and Kritsada Pornwaerod
Ram Pissawad (2007) - Pattarapol Silpajarn and Napapa Tuntrakul
Pleng Ruk Rim Fung Kong (2007)- Alexandra Bounxouei and Sukollawat Kanarot
Rahut Risaya (2007) - Pattarapol Silpajarn and Woranut Wongsawan
Fah Mee Tawun Hua Jai Chun Mee Tur (2007) - Sornram Teppitak and Warattaya Nilkuha
Bu Peh Leh Ruk (2007) - Pachrapa Chaichua and Nattawut Skidjai
Nong Miew Kearl Petch (2007) - Savika Chaiyadej and Siwat Chotchaicharin
Dang Duang Harutai (2007) - Sukollawat Kanarot and Usamanee Waitayanon
Rak Nee Hua Jai Rao Jong This Love Belongs to Our Heart (2007)- Teeradeth Wongpuapun and Janie Tienphosuwan
Song Kram Nang Fah  Battle of Angels (2008)- Namthip Jongrachatawiboon and Nawat Kulrattanarak with Saharat Sangkapreecha
Jam Loey Rak Defendant of Love (2008)- Aum Atichart and Aff Takasorn
Yuy Fah Ta Din (2008) - Pachrapa Chaichua and Weir Sukkolawat
Sawan Biang Paridise Diversion (2008) - Teeradeth Wongpuapun and Ann Thongprasom
Tueng Rai Kor Ruk (2008) - Paul Pattarapon and Namfon Patcharin
Ba Darn Jai Nether Heart (2008) - Aum Atichart and Margie Rasee
Sud Daen Hua Jai (2008) - Num Sornram Teppitak and Yardthip
Botun Gleep Sudtai (2008) - Aum Atichart and Aff Takasorn
Nang Tard (2008)- Suvanant Kongying and Vee Veerapat
Silamanee (2008) - Suvanant Kongying and Paul Pattarapon
Ngao Asoke (2008) - Pong Nawat and Pueng Kanya
Tur Keu Cheewit (You Are My Life; 2008) - Sawika Chaiyadech, Sukollawat Kanarot, Usamanee Waitayanon
Mia Luang (2009) - Pachrapa Chaichua and Teerapat Sajakhul
Jaew Jai Rai (2009) - Pachrapa Chaichua and Pae Airak
Kwarm Rub Korng Superstar (2008) - Mos Pattiparn, Bee Namthip, Captain Puthanate, and Best Aticha
Porp Pee Faa (2009) - Oil Thana, Sammie Bunthitha, and Yui Chiranan
Sood Sanae Ha (2009) - Teeradeth Wongpuapun and Ann Thongprasom
Kom Faek II (2009) - Poh Nattawut, Noon Worranuch, Oh Anuchyd, Cheer Thikumporn, Cee Siwat, Benz Punyapon, Kelly Rattapong, Pang Ornjira
Dong Poo Dee (2009)

2010s 
Kularb Neua Mek (2010) - Pachrapa Chaichua and Woranuch Wongsawan
Prajun Lai Payuk (2010) - Pachrapa Chaichua and Weir Sukollawat
Phaw Nu Bpen Superstar (2010) - Sukollawat Kanarot and Jakajaan Akumsiri
Taddao Bussaya (2010) - Thrisadee Sahawong and Worakarn Rojanawat
Koo Kan San Ruk (2010) - Pachrapa Chaichua and Shakrit Yamnam
365 Wan Haeng Ruk (2010) - Teeradeth Wongpuapun and Ann Thongprasom
Sao Chai Hi-Tech (2010) - Akkaphan Namart and Warattaya Nilkuha
Suay Rerd Cherd Sode (2010) - Rattapoom Tokongsub and Janie Tienphosuwan
Wan Jai Gub Nai Jom Ying (2010)
Pathapee Leh Ruk (2010)
Kha Khong Khun (2011) - Pong Nawat and Woranut Wongsawan
Kularb Rai Glay Ruk (2011) - Grate Warinton and Peeranee Kongthai
Bundai Dok Ruk (Staircase of Crown Flowers; 2011) - Akkaphan Namart and Peechaya Wattanamontree with Sammy Cowell
Dok Som Si Thong (2011) - Araya A. Hargate and Louis Scott
Ruk Pathiharn (2011)
Tawan Deard (2011)
Sua Sung Fah (The Tiger commands the Heaven; 2011) - Rangsiroj Panpeng, Kelly Tanapat, Chanapol Satya, Ploypapas Thananchaiyakarn, Chartchai Ngamsan
Dok Soke (Sad Flower; 2012) - The latest of one remakes of the same story; the earliest work aired in 1995. Cheribelle Lanlalin, Nawat Kulrattanarak, Sopitnapa Chumpanee and Kriangkrai Aunhanan with Jarunee Suksawat
Raeng Ngao (2012) - The latest of four remakes of the same story; the earliest work aired in 1986
Nuer Mek 2 (2012)
Khu Kam (Sunset at Chaopraya; 2013) - The latest of five remakes of the same story; the earliest work aired in 2000. Sukrit Wisetkaew, Nuengthida Sopon, Napat Intarajaieua and Sorapong Chatree
Khun Chai Ronapee (2013)
Dome Thong (Golden Dome; 2013) - The latest of two remakes of the same story; the earliest work aired in 1999. Tussaneeya Karnsomnut, Veeraparb Suparbpaiboon and Duangdao Jarujinda with Jiranan Manojam
Luerd Chao Phraya (Blood of Chao Phraya; 2013) - Thana Suttikamul, Jiranan Manojam, Rangsiroj Panpeng and Pattaradet Sanguankwamdee with Arpa Pawilai
Fai Huan (Masquerade; 2013) - A story of murder and revenge. BBTV Channel 7
Peek Mongkut (Wings of Desire; 2014) - Khemanit Jamikorn, Wongsakorn Poramathakorn, Karnklao Duaysienklao and Nusba Punnakanta
Cubic (2014) - Mobster falls in love with clever girl. Chalida Vijitvongthong and Tanin Manoonsilp
Kom Payabaht (2014) - The latest of one remakes of the same story; the earliest work aired in 2001. Tussaneeya Karnsomnut, Tisanart Sornsuek and Pattaradet Sanguankwamdee
La Ruk Sut Kop Fah (2014) - Peechaya Wattanamontree and Sukollawat Kanarot
Khun Pee Tee Rak (Mr. Ghost, My Dear; 2014) - Pimchanok Luevisadpaibul and Saran Sirilak
Plerng Chim Plee (2014) - Atichart Chumnanon and Ranee Campen
Full House (2014)
Pround (2014) - Pachrapa Chaichua and Sukollawat Kanarot
Leelawadee Plerng (The Secret Truth; 2015) - Anyarin Terathananpat and Thanwa Suriyajak with Nusba Punnakanta
Vimarn Mekhala (Mekkhala Heaven; 2015) - The latest of one remakes of the same story; the earliest work aired in 1999. Ranee Campen and Andrew Gregson
Sud Kaen Saen Ruk (Most Hate, Most Love; 2015) - Atshar Nampan, Manasnan Panlertwongskul, Patiparn Pataweekarn, Rhatha Phongam and Ratklao Amaradit
Waen Sawat (2015) - Khemanit Jamikorn
Baan Saithong (Golden Sand House; 2015) - The latest of five remakes of the same story; the earliest work aired in 2000. Peechaya Wattanamontree and Veraparb Suparbpaiboon
Rak Rae (Dahlia; 2015) - Khemanit Jamikorn, Akkaphan Namart and Sorapong Chatree with Princess Soamsavali
Thong 10 (2015)
Pleung Pra Nang (The Royal Fire; 2017) - The latest of one remakes of the same story; the earliest work aired in 1995.  Pachrapa Chaichua, Jiranan Manojam and Kelly Tanapat with Tussaneeya Karnsomnut
Rak Nakara (2017) - The latest of one remakes of the same story; the earliest work aired in 2000. Natapohn Tameeruks, Nittha Jirayungyurn and Prin Suparat
Nam Sor Sai (Duration; 2017) - The latest of four remakes of the same story; the earliest work aired in 2001. Sornram Teppitak, Suvanant Kongying and Sopitnapa Choompanee
Khiao Ratchasi (2017)
Ngao (2018)
The Crown Princess (2018)
Love Destiny (TV series) (2018) - Ranee Campen and Tanawat Wattanaputi
Hua Jai Sila (2019)
Mia Noi (2019)
Fai Hima (2019)

2020s 

 Game of Outlaws (2021)

References

Thai television soap operas